Frank Fletcher (1874–1936) was an English footballer who played in the Football League for West Bromwich Albion. His only appearance for West Brom was in a 1–0 win against Stoke on 9 November 1895.

References

1874 births
1936 deaths
English footballers
Association football outside forwards
English Football League players
Reading F.C. players
West Bromwich Albion F.C. players
Grimsby Town F.C. players